Rössner or Rößner may refer to:

Alfred Rößner (1911–2005), Austrian cross-country skier who competed in the 1936 Winter Olympics
Stephan Rössner (born 1942), Swedish physician and world-renowned expert on dieting
Tabea Rößner (born 1966), German politician

See also
Rossner